Ronald F. Pinkard (born January 22, 1941 in Denver, Colorado) is an American actor best known for his role as Dr. Mike Morton in the Jack Webb produced television series Emergency!

Early life
Pinkard was raised in Denver, Colorado. He attended Whittier Elementary School, Cole Jr. High and Manual High School. After high school he spent four years in the Navy as a Hospital Corpsman. He studied drama at the University of Colorado Boulder.

Career
Pinkard has appeared in episodes of several television series, including Dragnet, Barnaby Jones, Ironside, Mission: Impossible, Perry Mason, Adam-12, Quincy, M.E., The Partridge Family, Wild Wild West, Matlock, Gemini Man, The White Shadow, Matt Houston, General Hospital and Knight Rider. His most notable role was Dr. Mike Morton on Emergency!.

He also served as a technical advisor on the movie Flight of the Intruder, and received a "special thanks" in the movies Tiger Street, and as LCDR Ronald F. Pinkard, USNR in the movie The Hunt for Red October. In most of his roles, he portrays police officers, or doctors. He played Judge McElvy in Perry Mason: The Case of the Defiant Daughter (TV Movie 1990).

He served as a lieutenant commander in the United States Navy Reserve. He retired as a full commander.

Pinkard served as head of the Denver Film Commission from 1991 to 2003.

Filmography

Film

Television

References

External links
 

1941 births
Living people
African-American male actors
Male actors from Denver
American male television actors
American male voice actors
United States Navy corpsmen
21st-century African-American people
20th-century African-American people
African-American United States Navy personnel